Mamadou Keita is a sabre fencer from Senegal.

He participated in the 2008 Summer Olympics. He won in the table of 64 match versus Satoshi Ogawa (15-14), then lost in the round of 32 versus Rareș Dumitrescu (7-15). He seeded 29th overall.

References

Year of birth missing (living people)
Living people
Senegalese male sabre fencers
Fencers at the 2008 Summer Olympics
Olympic fencers of Senegal
Place of birth missing (living people)